The 2016 Women's Hockey Junior World Cup was the 8th edition of the Women's Hockey Junior World Cup. It was held from 24 November to 4 December 2016 in Santiago, Chile.

Argentina won the tournament after defeating defending champions the Netherlands 4–2 in the final. This was the first time Argentina had won the Junior World Cup since the 1993 tournament in Terrassa, Spain.

Australia won the third place match by defeating Spain 3–1 on a penalty shootout after a 1–1 draw. This was Australia's first Junior World Cup medal in 15 years.

Qualification
Each continental federation received a number of quotas depending on the FIH World Rankings for teams qualified through their junior continental championships. Alongside the host nation, 16 teams competed in the tournament.

Squads

First round
All times are Chile Time (UTC−03:00)

Pool A

Pool B

Pool C

Pool D

Classification round

Thirteenth to sixteenth place classification

Cross-overs

Fifteenth and sixteenth place

Thirteenth and fourteenth place

Ninth to twelfth place classification

Cross-overs

Eleventh and twelfth place

Ninth and tenth place

Medal round

Bracket

Quarter-finals

Fifth to eighth place classification

Cross-overs

Seventh and eighth place

Fifth and sixth place

First to fourth place classification

Semi-finals

Third and fourth place

Final

Awards

Statistics

Final rankings

Goalscorers

See also
2016 Men's Hockey Junior World Cup

References

 
Women's Hockey Junior World Cup
International women's field hockey competitions hosted by Chile
Hockey Junior World Cup
Sports competitions in Santiago
Junior World Cup
Hockey Junior World Cup Women
Hockey Junior World Cup Women
Hockey Junior World Cup Women